Yes. is the fifth extended play (EP) album by South Korean boy band Golden Child. It was released on January 25, 2021, through Woollim Entertainment and distributed by Kakao M. It contains six songs, including its lead single "Burn It".

Background and release 
On January 1, 2021, Woollim Entertainment released two teaser photos and a teaser video announcing their return with their fifth EP on January 25. On January 4, they released the concept photos and the concept trailer of Choi Bo-min, also revealing Yes. as the name of the EP. They continued to release the individual concept photos and the concept trailer of other members one by one until January 13. On January 14, the group concept photo was released. On January 18, the first music video teaser for the lead single, which later revealed to be "Burn It", was released. On January 19-20, the tracklist and the preview for the EP was released, respectively. On January 21, the second music video teaser for "Burn It" was released. On January 25, Yes. was released along with the music video for "Burn It".

Track listing

Charts

Weekly charts

Monthly charts

Year-end charts

Accolades

Music program awards

References 

2021 EPs
Golden Child (band) albums
Korean-language EPs
Woollim Entertainment EPs
Kakao M EPs